Riko Yoshida (吉田 莉胡, born 18 June 2002) is a Japanese professional footballer who plays as a midfielder for WE League club Chifure AS Elfen Saitama.

Club career 
Yoshida made her WE League debut on 12 September 2021.

References 

Chifure AS Elfen Saitama players
2002 births
Living people
Japanese women's footballers
Women's association footballers not categorized by position